The SAIL-SBI Open was a golf tournament on the Asian Tour, played in India between 2008 and 2014. It was co-sanctioned by the Professional Golf Tour of India. The title sponsors were Steel Authority of India Limited (SAIL) and State Bank of India (SBI).

The inaugural tournament was played at Jaypee Greens Golf Resort in Greater Noida, before moving to the Jack Nicklaus designed Signature Course at Classic Golf Resort, just outside Gurgaon, near New Delhi in 2009. Since 2010, the tournament has been played at the Delhi Golf Club.

In 2009, Chapchai Nirat, set a new Asian Tour scoring record when he captured the title with a 32-under-par aggregate of 256.

Winners

Notes

References

External links
Coverage on the Asian Tour's official site

Former Asian Tour events
Golf tournaments in India
Recurring sporting events established in 2008
Recurring sporting events disestablished in 2014